Martha Whitehead is an American politician and pastor from the U.S. state of Texas. She was the last Texas State Treasurer before the position was abolished by constitutional amendment in 1996.

Career
Whitehead served as the mayor of Longview, Texas. In 1993, Texas Governor Ann Richards appointed Whitehead as Texas State Treasurer, filling the vacancy created when the previous incumbent, Kay Bailey Hutchison was elected to the United States Senate.

Texas Treasurer 
In 1994, Whitehead ran for State Treasurer on a platform of abolishing the office and transferring its few remaining functions to the Texas Comptroller of Public Accounts. In 1995, the Texas Legislature passed a proposed constitutional amendment to abolish the office, which was approved by a majority of voters later that same year. The office was formally dismantled in 1996. On her last day in office, August 31, 1996, she scraped her name and title off the glass front of the Treasurer's headquarters.

References

Year of birth missing (living people)
Living people
People from Longview, Texas
Mayors of places in Texas
State treasurers of Texas
Texas Democrats
Women mayors of places in Texas
Texas A&M University–Texarkana alumni